Destino la gloria, is a Mexican telenovela produced by Televisa and originally transmitted by Telesistema Mexicano.

Cast 
Irma Dorantes
Adalberto Martínez
Miguel Córcega
Dolores Camarillo

References

External links 

Mexican telenovelas
Televisa telenovelas
Spanish-language telenovelas
1968 telenovelas
1968 Mexican television series debuts
1968 Mexican television series endings